Brijesh Tomar (born 18 January 1978) is an Indian cricketer. He played in 35 first-class and 12 List A matches for Madhya Pradesh from 2002 to 2008. He became captain of the team in 2007, and later became a match referee.

See also
 List of Madhya Pradesh cricketers

References

External links
 

1978 births
Living people
Indian cricketers
Madhya Pradesh cricketers
Cricketers from Bhopal